Jake Shears is the self-titled debut solo album by Jake Shears, released on August 10, 2018. "Creep City" serves as the album's lead single.

Recording and composition
The album was recorded in Louisville with Kevin Ratterman, as well as members of My Morning Jacket.

Promotion
"Creep City" serves as the album's lead single. The music video was directed by Mac Boucher.

The second single was "Sad Song Backwards", which lyrics deal with face depression doing joyful things. It was accompanied by a lyric video, that Shears declared he made himself.

"Big Bushy Moustache" was released as the third single. Its video was directed by Mac Boucher too, and consists on Shears strutting in New Orleans, urging other men to join him in the celebration of facial hair. It features a cameo by Queens of the Stone Age's Josh Homme (who had previously collaborated with Scissor Sisters on the promotion of 2010 Magic Hour).

"Everything I Ever Need" was released as the fourth single, with a video (also directed by Boucher) inspired by Elton John and Freddie Mercury.

Shears toured the album in the United States and will support Kylie Minogue touring Australia in 2019.

Critical reception

Jake Shears received generally positive reviews from music critics. At Metacritic, which assigns a normalized rating out of 100 to reviews from mainstream critics, the album has an average score of 78 based on 12 reviews, indicating "generally favorable reviews".

Track listing

B-Sides EP
The B-Sides EP was released in 2019, a year after the album.

Charts

References

2018 debut albums
Jake Shears albums